Maximilian Daublebsky Freiherr von Sterneck zu Ehrenstein (14 February 1829 – 5 December 1897) was an Austrian admiral who served as the chief administrator of the Austro-Hungarian Navy from 1883 until his death.

Biography
He was born at Klagenfurt, into a family from  Bohemia where they long held the office of mayor of Budweis. In 1620 they were ennobled in Austria with the addition of the German name von Sterneck. Jacob Daublebsky von Sterneck was further created Freiherr (Baron) von Sterneck zu Ehrenstein in 1792. His son Joseph settled in Carinthia and purchased the castle of Krastowitz in Klagenfurt, where his son Maximilian was born in 1829. Maximilian Daublebsky von Sterneck was educated to be an officer in the then Austrian Navy,
attaining the rank of lieutenant commander (Korvettenkapitän) in 1859. He was promoted to commander (Fregattenkapitän) in 1864 and later was appointed to command the flagship Erzherzog Ferdinand Max by rear-admiral (Konteradmiral) Wilhelm von Tegetthoff.

In the Battle of Lissa (20 July 1866), Daublebsky von Sterneck succeeded in by ramming the Italian flagship Re d'Italia, which capsized and sank. For his services during the battle, he was awarded the Military Order of Maria Theresa. In an 1880 painting by Anton Romako, Daublebsky is pictured at Tegetthoff's side on the bridge during the ramming attack (Rammstosstaktik).

The creation of the Dual Monarchy in 1867 was accompanied by the reorganization of the naval service as the Austro-Hungarian Navy. Daublebsky von Sterneck was appointed port commander at Pola in 1869 with the rank of full captain (Linienschiffskapitän. He was promoted to Kontradmiral in 1872 and took part in the 1872-74 North Polar expedition of Julius von Payer and Karl Weyprecht as commander of the Isbjörn. It was this expedition that discovered Franz Josef Land, named for the Austrian emperor, in 1873.

Daublebsky von Sterneck was named to succeed Friedrich von Pöck as Marinekommandant (Navy Commander) and Chef der Marinesektion (Chief of the Naval Section of the War Ministry) in November 1883 with the rank of Vizeadmiral. His efforts to modernize the Navy were hamstrung by interminable political friction between the Austrian and Hungarian halves of the empire. When Sir Edward J. Reed published the second half of his profile of the Continental navies in Harper's in February 1887, he dismissed the Austro-Hungarian Navy as antiquated and omitted any tabulation of information about the fleet's ships—in sharp contrast to his description of the fleet of Austria-Hungary's principal ally, Germany.

Promoted to full admiral in 1888, Daublebsky von Sterneck persevered in his efforts to modernize the Austro-Hungarian fleet until his death in Vienna in 1897. He initiated the construction - 1891–1898 - of the navy garrison Catholic Church of Our Lady of the Sea (//) in Pola's suburb San Policarpo. His body was interred in that church, to which Daublebsky von Sterneck had devoted much effort. His heart however was placed in the family crypt in the castle of Krastowitz. Daublebsky von Sterneck was succeeded as head of the navy by Hermann von Spaun.

Honours 
He received the following orders and decorations:

Literature 
 German Wikipedia entry "Maximilian Daublebsky von Sterneck'
 Sir Edward James Reed, "The Navies of the Continent. II - The Italian, Russian, German, Austrian, and Turkish Navies. Harper's New Monthly Magazine, European Edition, February 1887.

See also 
 Austro-Hungarian Navy

References 

1829 births
1897 deaths
Military personnel from Klagenfurt
19th-century Austrian people
Austro-Hungarian admirals
Austrian monarchists
Bohemian nobility
Barons of Austria
Austrian people of Czech descent
Knights Cross of the Military Order of Maria Theresa
Grand Crosses of the Order of the Dannebrog
Commandeurs of the Légion d'honneur
Grand Cordons of the Order of the Rising Sun
Grand Crosses of Naval Merit
Commanders Grand Cross of the Order of the Sword